The Soft Magnetic Materials Conference, commonly referred to as SMM, is an international conference devoted to all kinds of soft magnetic materials with the emphasis on industrial and applications aspects.

Format and purpose 

The SMM is held for three days, every two years, often at the beginning of September in a European country. Each time the SMM has a different logo.

In SMM18 (organised by Wolfson Centre for Magnetics there were 260 participants from over 30 countries. There were 306 scientific papers presented, out of which around 200 are peer reviewed and will be published in Journal of Magnetism and Magnetic Materials, Elsevier at the beginning of 2008.

In the past the SMM proceedings have also been published in IEEE Transactions on Magnetics
 or other peer reviewed journals.

The SMM is the largest international conference devoted to soft magnetic materials. It has active participation of the academic world as well as of industry, with a high scientific level of contributed and invited communications.

The main aim of the SMM is to bring together engineers and scientists from universities, research institutions and industry who are active in research, development and industrial applications of the materials. The programme of the conference includes invited lectures by academic and industrial experts, oral presentations and poster sessions for regular contributions.

Scope
Typical topics of the SMM are:
 Basic magnetisation processes including domain studies and Barkhausen noise
 Magnetisation characterisation and measurement techniques
 Losses, magnetostriction and B-H properties
 Non-oriented and grain-oriented electrical steels
 Novel and special magnetic materials
 Fe-Ni, Fe-Co, amorphous and nanocrystalline alloys
 Composites, powder cores and ferrites
 Power applications (e.g. motors, transformers and actuators)
 Sensors, high frequency and electronic applications
 Modelling, simulation or prediction of material and device performance
 Design of electromagnetic components and systems
 Energy and environmental aspects

Dates and locations 
 24th SMM, 4–7 September 2019 - Poznań, Poland
 23rd SMM, 10–13 September 2017 - Sevilla, Spain
 22nd SMM, 2015 13–16 September 2015 - São Paulo, Brazil
 21st SMM, 2013 1–4 September 2013 - Budapest, Hungary
 20th SMM, 2011 18–22 September 2011 - Athens, Greece
 19th SMM, 7–9 September 2009 - Torino, Italy
 18th SMM, 1–3 September 2007 - Cardiff, United Kingdom
 17th SMM, 7–9 September 2005 - Bratislava, Slovakia
 16th SMM, 9–12 September 2003 - Düsseldorf, Germany
 15th SMM, 5–7 September 2001 - Bilbao, Spain
 14th SMM, 8–10 September 1999 - Balatonfüred, Hungary
 13th SMM, 24–26 September 1997 - Grenoble, France
 12th SMM, 12–14 September 1995 - Kraków, Poland
 11th SMM, 29 September - 1 October 1993 - Venezia, Italy
 10th SMM, 11–13 September 1991 - Dresden, Germany
 9th SMM, 6–9 September 1989 - El Escorial, Spain
 8th SMM, 1–4 September 1987 - Badgastein, Austria
 7th SMM, 5–8 September 1985 - Blackpool, United Kingdom
 6th SMM, 6–9 September 1983 - Eger, Hungary
 5th SMM, 22–25 September 1981 - Grenoble, France
 4th SMM, 11–14 September 1979 - Münster, Germany
 3rd SMM, 14–16 September 1977 - Bratislava, Czechoslovakia
 2nd SMM, 9–11 April 1975 - Cardiff, United Kingdom
 1st SMM, 3–5 September 1973 - Torino, Italy

Organising committees
The conference series has an International Organising Committee, chaired by J.M. Barandiaran, of Bilbao, Spain. The previous chairs were Anthony J. Moses, of Cardiff, UK, who stepped down in 2007, and John E. Thompson who was the founder chair.

For each SMM there is a Local Organising Committee (academic and research members of staff of the local university), which is responsible for local arrangements, venue, technical programme, conference dinner, etc.

References

External links
 http://www.cardiff.ac.uk/SMM18
 http://www.smm19.eu
 https://www.ifmpan.poznan.pl/smm24/pub/smm24_abstracts.pdf - SMM24 book of abstracts

Physics conferences